Kenneth C. Jenne II (born December 1, 1946) is a former Democratic member of the Florida State Senate and a former sheriff of Broward County, which encompasses Fort Lauderdale. He resigned as sheriff in September 2007, after having pleaded guilty to federal tax evasion and mail fraud. On November 16, 2007, he was sentenced to a year and a day in federal prison.

Education
Jenne was born in Lake Worth. His father, Kenneth C. Jenne Sr., was employed by a utility company, and his mother worked for the  Palm Beach County Clerk of the Court. He attended Palm Beach Junior College, where he was student government president. In 1968, he earned his Bachelor of Arts in political science from Florida Atlantic University in Boca Raton, where he served as student body president.

He subsequently earned a Juris Doctor from Florida State University in Tallahassee. He later served in the United States Army Reserve. He retired at the rank of sergeant as a public safety supervisor. He graduated from the FBI's National Executive Institute, as well as the National Sheriffs' Institute.

Career

Politics
By 1972, Jenne was a prosecutor for the Broward County State Attorney's Office. Following his time as a prosecutor, he was elected to the Broward County Commission and served as commission chairman in 1976.

Jenne was elected to the Florida Senate in 1978 to represent District 32. He would remain in this position until 1988. Jenne was subsequently elected to the Florida Senate in 1990, this time representing District 29 and he would stay in this position until 1998. Jenne is credited with holding a majority of the top committee chairmanships in the Florida Senate, including the position of Senate Democratic Leader. In January 1998, Florida Governor Lawton Chiles, a fellow Democrat, selected him to become Broward County sheriff to succeed the late
Ron Cochran.

Law enforcement
As sheriff, Jenne directed a 6,300-member organization with a $638 million budget. Under his direction, the organization was responsible for law enforcement and fire rescue duties in 14 cities and towns, as well as all unincorporated areas of Broward County. He resigned on September 4, 2007 in light of federal corruption charges.

Corruption

Jenne resigned in September 2007 after agreeing to plead guilty to federal tax evasion and mail fraud charges after a corruption investigation uncovered crimes in his outside business dealings, federal prosecutors said. Jenne faced a possible grand jury indictment on more serious money laundering charges. Several of Jenne's long-term Democratic allies, including former Florida Attorney General Bob Butterworth and former Florida Senate President Jim Scott, pleaded for leniency.

Jenne pleaded guilty to three counts of tax evasion and one count of mail fraud conspiracy and was sentenced to a year and a day in federal prison.

Incarceration
Before being assigned to prison, Jenne resided in the Federal Detention Center, Miami. In December 2007 he was transferred to the United States Penitentiary, Atlanta. Later that month he was moved to the penitentiary in Lee County, Virginia.

Jenne served most of his sentence in the Virginia prison. By September 2008 he was moved back to FDC Miami, as he was a possible witness in a civil case against the Broward Sheriff's Office involving a jail beating. Jenne was released from FDC Miami on September 29, 2008. He now reportedly lives in Hollywood, Florida and is a business consultant.

References

External links
The BSO - Official Website
The BSO - About the Sheriff's Office

 

|-

|-

|-

Living people
Florida Atlantic University alumni
Florida State University alumni
1946 births
Florida sheriffs
Florida lawyers
Florida Democrats
American people convicted of tax crimes
People from Lake Worth Beach, Florida
Florida politicians convicted of crimes
20th-century American lawyers
20th-century American politicians
21st-century American politicians